Conquistadors (2000) is a documentary retelling of the story of the Spanish expeditions of conquest of the Americas. In this 4-part series historian Michael Wood travels in the footsteps of the Spanish expeditions, from Amazonia to Lake Titicaca, and from the deserts of North Mexico to the heights of Machu Picchu.

Episode list
 "The Fall of the Aztecs"
 "The Conquest of the Incas"
 "The Search for El Dorado"
 "All the World is Human"

References

Web site https://www.pbs.org/conquistadors/

BBC television documentaries about history
British military television series
2000s British documentary television series
2000 British television series debuts
2000 British television series endings